Scampi may refer to:

Seafood

Various kinds of small clawed lobster:
 Scampi, a name for the Norway lobster (Nephrops norvegicus) and similar species, as well as for some dishes made using various kinds of prawn or shrimp (Shrimp scampi.)
 Nephrops norvegicus, also known as true scampi, Norway lobster, or langoustine
 Various members of the genus Metanephrops:
 Metanephrops andamanicus = Metanephrops velutinus, Pacific scampi
 Metanephrops australiensis, Australian scampi
 Metanephrops boschmai, Bight scampi (western Australia)
 Metanephrops challengeri, New Zealand scampi, Pacific scampi
 Metanephrops sibogae, Melville Island Scampi
 Metanephrops taiwanicus, Pacific scampi
 Metanephrops thomsoni, Pacific scampi
 Macrobrachium rosenbergii, often called (freshwater) scampi in South Asia.

People
Scampi, drummer in the Groovie Ghoulies

Fictional characters
Little Cousin Scampi, a cousin of Sooty seen in The Sooty Show, later Sooty & Co
The Scampi from Fingerbobs

Other
Standard CMMI Appraisal Method for Process Improvement
The flash animation by Jonti Picking